Cortnee Brooke Vine (born 9 April 1998) is an Australian soccer player who plays for Sydney FC, having previously played for the Western Sydney Wanderers, the Brisbane Roar and the Newcastle Jets, all in the W-League.

She represented Australia at under-17 and under-20 level before making her senior debut at the 2022 AFC Women's Asian Cup.

Starting her career as a winger on the right flank, she can perform equally well in defence as a full-back.

Club career

Brisbane Roar, 2015–2017
Vine made her debut for the Brisbane Roar on 25 October 2015 at age 16 in a match against the Western Sydney Wanderers. She made seven appearances for the team during the 2015–16 W-League season. Brisbane finished in fourth place in the regular season, securing a berth to the play-offs. In the semi-finals against regular season champions Melbourne City, the Roar lost 5–4 on penalties after 120 minutes of regular and extra time produced no goals for either side.

Newcastle Jets, 2017–2019
Vine joined the Newcastle Jets ahead of the 2017–18 W-League season.

Western Sydney Wanderers, 2019–2020
In November 2019, Vine joined the Western Sydney Wanderers.

International career
Vine has represented Australia at under-17 and under-20 level. In July 2016, she scored the equaliser goal against Myanmar at the 2016 AFF Women's Championship as Australia went on to top their group. On 24 January 2022, she made her first appearance for the senior team against the Philippines at the 2022 AFC Women's Asian Cup.

International goals

See also

References

Further reading
 Grainey, Timothy (2012), Beyond Bend It Like Beckham: The Global Phenomenon of Women's Soccer, University of Nebraska Press, 
 Stewart, Barbara (2012), Women's Soccer: The Passionate Game, Greystone Books,

External links
 

Living people
1998 births
Australian women's soccer players
Brisbane Roar FC (A-League Women) players
Newcastle Jets FC (A-League Women) players
Western Sydney Wanderers FC (A-League Women) players
A-League Women players
Women's association football defenders
Australia women's international soccer players